This is a list of years in Kazakhstan.

20th century

21st century

See also
 Outline of Kazakhstan
 Index of Kazakhstan-related articles
 List of Kazakhstan-related topics

 
History of Kazakhstan
Kazakhstan-related lists
Kazahstan